is a town located in Akō District, Hyōgo Prefecture, Japan.

Geography 
Kamigōri is located in the southwestern corner of Hyōgo Prefecture.

Neighboring municipalities 
Hyōgo Prefecture
 Aioi
 Akō
 Sayō
 Tatsuno
Okayama Prefecture
Bizen

Climate
Kamigōri has a humid subtropical climate (Köppen climate classification Cfa) with hot summers and cool to cold winters. Precipitation is significantly higher in summer than in winter, though on the whole lower than most parts of Honshū, and there is no significant snowfall.

Demographics
Per Japanese census data, the population of Kamigōri in 2020 is 13,879 people. Kamigōri has been conducting censuses since 1950.

History
The area of the modern town of Kamigōri was within ancient Harima Province and was the base of the Akamatsu clan during the Muromachi period. In the Edo Period, it was divided between Amagasaki Domain and tenryō territory under direct administration of the Tokugawa shogunate. Following the Meiji restoration, the village of Kamigōri was created within Akō District, Hyōgo. It was raised town status on April 1, 1913. On March 15, 1955, Kamigōri expanded by annexing the neighboring villages of Takata, Kurai, and Funasaka.

Government
Kamigōri has a mayor-council form of government with a directly elected mayor and a unicameral town council of 10 members. Kamigōri, together with the city of Akō, contributes one member to the Hyogo Prefectural Assembly. In terms of national politics, the town is part of Hyōgo 12th district of the lower house of the Diet of Japan.

Economy
The economy of Kamigōri is based on agriculture and light manufacturing. The town is increasingly become a commuter town for nearby Himeji.

Education
Kamigōri has three public elementary schools and two public middle schools operated by the town government and two public high schools operated by the Hyōgo Prefectural Department of Education. University of Hyogo has a campus in Kamigōri.

Transportation

Railway
 JR West – San'yo Main Line
   
Chizu Express - Chizu Line
   -  -

Highway

Local attractions
 Shirahata Castle - A castle ruin, built by Akamatsu Norimura.
 San'yōdō Yamanoumaya site, National Historic Site

References

External links

Kamigōri official website 

Towns in Hyōgo Prefecture
Kamigōri, Hyōgo